Simon Feindouno (born 15 August 1985) is a Guinean footballer who plays as a midfielder or forward. He is capable of playing as an attacking midfielder, winger, or striker.

Career 
Born in Conakry, Guinea, Feindouno began his professional career 2001 with OGC Nice and was transferred to RC Lens in 2002. In January 2007 was loaned out to FC Istres with a purchase option and the club pulled the option and he moved permanent in January 2008 to Istres for free.

Feindouno scored nine goals in 25 2013–14 UAE Pro League matches for Ajman Club.

He was in the extended squad from Guinea national football team and was formerly member of the U-23 team from his country Guinea.

Personal life 
Simon is Pascal's and Benjamin Feindouno's younger brother.

References

External links 
 
 Foot-National Player Profile
 

Living people
1985 births
Sportspeople from Conakry
Association football midfielders
Association football forwards
Guinean footballers
OGC Nice players
RC Lens players
FC Istres players
Ligue 1 players
Ligue 2 players
Championnat National players
UAE First Division League players
UAE Pro League players
Al-Ittihad Kalba SC players
Al-Shaab CSC players
Dubai CSC players
Ajman Club players
Al-Arabi SC (UAE) players
Masafi Club players
Expatriate footballers in France
Guinean expatriate footballers
Expatriate footballers in the United Arab Emirates